Woodland Township may refer to:

Illinois
 Woodland Township, Carroll County, Illinois
 Woodland Township, Fulton County, Illinois

Iowa
 Woodland Township, Decatur County, Iowa

Michigan
 Woodland Township, Michigan

Minnesota
 Woodland Township, Wright County, Minnesota

New Jersey
 Woodland Township, Burlington County, New Jersey

Oklahoma
 Woodland Township, Logan County, Oklahoma

South Dakota
 Woodland Township, Clark County, South Dakota, in Clark County, South Dakota

See also
Woodland (disambiguation)

Township name disambiguation pages